Cécile Hane (born October 8, 1987) is a Senegalese judoka, who played for the half-middleweight category. Hane represented Senegal at the 2008 Summer Olympics in Beijing, where she competed for the women's half-middleweight class (63 kg). Unfortunately, she lost the first preliminary round match to Venezuela's Ysis Barreto, who successfully scored an ippon (full point) and a seoi nage (shoulder throw), at one minute and forty-seven seconds.

References

External links
 
 
 
 NBC Olympics Profile

1987 births
Living people
Senegalese female judoka
Olympic judoka of Senegal
Judoka at the 2008 Summer Olympics